The weighted product model (WPM) is a popular multi-criteria decision analysis (MCDA) / multi-criteria decision making (MCDM) method.  It is similar to the weighted sum model (WSM).  The main difference is that instead of addition in the main mathematical operation, there is multiplication.

Description
As with all MCDA / MCDM methods, given is a finite set of decision alternatives described in terms of a number of decision criteria.  Each decision alternative is compared with the others by multiplying a number of ratios, one for each decision criterion.  Each ratio is raised to the power equivalent to the relative weight of the corresponding criterion.  

Suppose that a given MCDA problem is defined on m alternatives and n decision criteria.  Furthermore, let us assume that all the criteria are benefit criteria. That is, the higher the values are, the better it is.  Next suppose that wj denotes the relative weight of importance of the criterion Cj and aij is the performance value of alternative Ai when it is evaluated in terms of criterion Cj.  Then, if one wishes to compare the two alternatives AK and AL (where m ≥ K, L ≥ 1) then, the following product has to be calculated:

If the ratio P(AK/AL) is greater than or equal to the value 1, then it indicates that alternative AK is more desirable than alternative AL (in the maximization case).  If we are interested in determining the best alternative, then the best alternative is the one that is better than or at least equal to all other alternatives.

The WPM is often called dimensionless analysis because its mathematical structure eliminates any units of measure.

Therefore, the WPM can be used in single- and multi-dimensional MCDA / MCDM problems.  That is, on decision problems where the alternatives are described in terms that use different units of measurement.  An advantage of this method is that instead of the actual values it can use relative ones.

The following is a simple numerical example which illustrates how the calculations for this method can be carried out.  As data we use the same numerical values as in the numerical example described for the weighted sum model.  These numerical data are repeated next for easier reference.

Example

This simple decision problem is based on three alternatives denoted as A1, A2, and A3 each described in terms of four criteria C1, C2, C3 and C4.  Next, let the numerical data for this problem be as in the following decision matrix:

The above table specifies that the relative weight of the first criterion is 0.20, the relative weight for the second criterion is 0.15 and so on.  Similarly, the value of the first alternative (i.e., A1) in terms of the first criterion is equal to 25, the value of the same alternative in terms of the second criterion is equal to 20 and so on.   However, now the restriction to express all criteria in terms of the same measurement unit is not needed.  That is, the numbers under each criterion may be expressed in different units.

When the WPM is applied on the previous data, then the following values are derived:

Similarly, we also get:

Therefore, the best alternative is A1, since it is superior to all the other alternatives.  Furthermore, the following ranking of all three alternatives is as follows: A1 > A2 > A3  (where the symbol ">" stands for "better than").

An alternative approach with the WPM method is for the decision maker to use only products without the previous ratios. 
That is, to use the following variant of main formula given earlier:

In the previous expression the term P(AK) denotes the total performance value (i.e., not a relative one) of alternative AK when all the criteria are considered simultaneously under the WPM model.  Then, when the previous data are used, exactly the same ranking is derived.  Some interesting properties of this method are discussed in the 2000 book by Triantaphyllou on MCDA / MCDM.

History
Some of the first references to this method are due to Bridgman and Miller and Starr. The tutorial article by Tofallis describes its advantages over the weighted sum approach.

See also
 Ordinal Priority Approach
 Weighted sum model
More details on this method are given in the MCDM book by Triantaphyllou.

References 

Control theory
Decision theory
Mathematical and quantitative methods (economics)
Multiple-criteria decision analysis
Risk
Statistical inference